William I, Count of Nevers (c. 1029 – 20 June 1100), was the son of Renauld I, Count of Nevers and Hedwig of France, Countess d'Auxerre. He married Ermengarde, daughter of Renauld, Count of Tonnerre about 1039. William died in 1098.

William I and Ermengarde:

  Renauld II (d. 1089), succeeded his father as Count of Nevers and Count of Auxerre.
  William II, succeeded his father as Count of Tonnerre
  Robert (d. 1095), later Bishop of Auxerre
  Ermengarde (d. 1090–95), married Hubert de Beaumont-au-Maine, Viscount of Maine
  Helvise, married William, Count of Évreux

References

Sources

Nevers, William I, Count of
Nevers, William I, Count of
Counts of Nevers